The State Research Bureau (SRB), initially the State Research Centre (SRC), was a Ugandan intelligence agency. Active from 1971 until 1979, it served as a secret police organisation for President Idi Amin's regime. The SRB retained numerous agents and maintained a wide network of informants.

Background 
On 25 January 1971 Idi Amin, Commander of the Uganda Army, took power in Uganda following a coup which overthrew the government of President Milton Obote. His advisers suggested that he try to differentiate himself from Obote by disbanding the General Service Unit (GSU), Obote's intelligence agency, which was highly unpopular within the general populace.

History 
In February 1971 Amin dissolved the GSU and through a decree established the State Research Centre. Major Amin Ibrahim Onzi was appointed director, and technical assistance was sought from Israel in its formation. Its responsibilities were to gather military intelligence and conduct counterintelligence. The headquarters was located in a building on Nakasero hill in Kampala, next to the State Lodge Annex. The organisation was directly responsible to Amin. In early 1972 Amin ejected Israeli technicians from Uganda and changed the name of the organisation to the State Research Bureau (SRB). Agents from the Soviet Union were brought in to replace them, and they subsequently instructed SRB personnel in the methods of the KGB. Many were sent to the Soviet Union for specialised training. Others undertook military and police training in the United States and United Kingdom.

Male SRB agents commonly wore dark sunglasses, Kaunda suits, floral-print shirts, and bell-bottoms. Researcher Andrew Rice described them as "flagrant and fairly incompetent". The SRB recruited a substantial number of Rwandan immigrants, and attractive Rwandan Tutsi women were used as undercover operatives as well as stationed at airports, banks, hotels, restaurants, government offices, hospitals, and locations near Uganda's borders. Most personnel served for one year with the SRB before being reassigned to other government positions. Agents drove late model vehicles with special tags. Empowered by a sweeping February 1971 decree which gave state agents wide latitude to act, the SRB tortured and executed many suspected dissidents, provoking international outrage. Agents frequently abducted people by forcing them into the trunk of a car and driving off. For its role in state repression and killings, the SRB came to be derisively known among the Ugandan population as the "State Research Butchery". One contemporary account argued that the SRB rarely collected actual intelligence, and its members instead used their powers to incriminate people whom they had grudges against. In June 1974, in response to criticism of his regime and specifically accusations of numerous "disappearances" of persons in Uganda, Amin established a commission of inquiry to investigate abuses of state authority. The commission concluded that the SRB and another state security agency, the Public Safety Unit, were responsible for most of the disappearances. 

Despite its poor reputation, the SRB occasionally succeeded in uncovering plots aimed at deposing Amin. In 1977, it discovered that Ugandan exiles in Kenya were planning to invade Uganda. The SRB consequently forewarned the President, and the Uganda Army successfully repelled the invasion. Over time, the SRB further devolved; by late 1978, agents had formed criminal gangs which fought each other, and in one case SRB members robbed a bank in Kampala. The SRB also became less successful in eliminating suspected anti-Amin figures: Following the purge of Mustafa Adrisi in April 1978, SRB agents and Ugandan marines tried to massacre members of the Chui Battalion due to their suspected support for a pro-Adrisi coup, only to be gunned down by the soldiers. An attempt to arrest former minister Moses Ali around October of that year ended in the death of 10 agents following a shootout with his personal guards. By 1979 the bureau employed about 3,000 men and women as agents, many of them Nubians. Most of them fled Kampala when the city fell to Tanzanian and Ugandan rebel forces in April 1979. Shortly before they left, several agents tossed grenades into the holding cells of the SRB headquarters, killing about 100 detainees. The Tanzanians freed 13 survivors.

Legacy 
As a result of the Rwandan members of the SRB, Rwandans gained a reputation of being violent and ruthless in Uganda. After Amin's overthrow, this reputation was used to justify anti-Rwandan violence and suppression in the following years.

Notable personnel

Directors 
 Amin Ibrahim Onzi
 Francis Itabuka (1974–1977)
 Farouk Minawa (from 1977)

Agents 
 Faruk Malik
 Salim Sebi

Citations

References 

 
 
 
 
 
 
 
 

Secret police
Idi Amin